Hodge may refer to:

Places

United States
Hodge, California, an unincorporated community
Hodge, Louisiana, a village
Hodge, Missouri, an unincorporated community
The Hodge Building, the historic name of the Begich Towers in Whittier, Alaska

Other
Hodge Escarpment, Edith Ronne Land, Antarctica

Other uses
Hodge (surname)
Hodge baronets, two titles in the Baronetage of the United Kingdom, one extinct
Hodge 301, a star cluster in the Tarantula Nebula
Hodge (cat), Dr. Samuel Johnson's cat
Hodge, pseudonym of Roger Squires, crossword compiler

See also 
A list of mathematical concepts named after W. V. D. Hodge
Hodges (disambiguation)